United Nations Security Council resolution 1438, adopted unanimously on 14 October 2002, after reaffirming the principles of the United Nations Charter and Resolution 1373 (2001), the Council condemned the bombings in Bali, Indonesia.

The Security Council reaffirmed the need to combat threats to international peace and security caused by terrorist acts. It condemned the attacks in Bali which resulted in injuries and the loss of many lives, as well as terrorist acts carried out in other countries. The Council expressed sympathy and condolences to the families of the victims and the Indonesian government and people.

The resolution all states to co-operate with and provide assistance to the Indonesian authorities to bring the perpetrators to justice in accordance with their obligations under Resolution 1373. Finally, the Council concluded by expressing its determination to combat all forms of terrorism.

See also
 2002 Bali bombings
 List of United Nations Security Council Resolutions 1401 to 1500 (2002–2003)

References

External links
 
Text of the Resolution at undocs.org

 1438
2002 in Indonesia
 1438
 1438
2002 Bali bombings
October 2002 events